Clarksville High School can refer to:

Clarksville High School (Arkansas)
Clarksville High School (Iowa)
Clarksville High School (Tennessee)
Clarksville High School (Clarksville, Texas)
Clarksville Senior High School, Clarksville, Indiana